Microphotus is a genus of fireflies in the family Lampyridae. Microphotus are usually found in the southwestern region of the United States of America and adjoining parts of Mexico. There are seven described species in Microphotus in the United States and three more in Mexico.

Species
 Microphotus angustus LeConte, 1874
 Microphotus chiricahuae Green, 1959
 Microphotus curvophallus Zaragoza-Caballero, Vega-Badillo & Cifuentes-Ruiz, 2021
 Microphotus decarthrus Fall, 1912
 Microphotus dilatatus LeConte, 1866
 Microphotus fragilis E. Olivier, 1912
 Microphotus morronei Zaragoza-Caballero, López-Pérez & Rodríguez-Mirón, 2021
 Microphotus octarthrus Fall, 1912 (desert firefly)
 Microphotus pecosensis Fall, 1912
 Microphotus robustophallus Zaragoza-Caballero, Domínguez-León & González-Ramírez, 2021

References

Further reading

 
 
 

Lampyridae
Lampyridae genera
Bioluminescent insects